A list of notable films produced in Greece in the 1970s.

1970s

External links
 Greek film at the IMDb

1970s
Greek
Films